Villa Santa Maria (locally La Vìlle) is a town and comune in the province of Chieti, in the region of Abruzzo of southern Italy.

People
Francis Caracciolo
Michele Mascitti

References

Cities and towns in Abruzzo